This is a complete list of the operas of the Italian composer Pasquale Anfossi (1727–1797).

Anfossi wrote at least 33 opere buffe and drammi giocosi, 26 drammi per musica (opere serie), 8 farse and intermezzi, and 1 'azione drammatica giocosa' (a one-act genre).

List

References

Anfossi page at Operone.de, retrieved 9 November 2009
Robinson, Michael F., and Hunter, Mary (1992), "Anfossi, Pasquale" in The New Grove Dictionary of Opera, ed. Stanley Sadie (London) 
Warrack, John and West, Ewan (1992), The Oxford Dictionary of Opera, 782 pages, 

 
Lists of operas by composer
Lists of compositions by composer